Neobola stellae is a species of ray-finned fish in the family Cyprinidae.
It is endemic to Lake Turkana in Ethiopia and Kenya. It can reach a maximum length of 2.3 cm.

Named in honor of Worthington’s wife Stella, a member of the expedition that collected the type specimen.

References

Neobola
Fish of Ethiopia
Freshwater fish of Kenya
Fish of Lake Turkana
Fish described in 1932
Taxa named by E. Barton Worthington
Taxonomy articles created by Polbot